N'Bushe Wright (born September 7, 1970) is an American actress and dancer. She attended and trained as a dancer at the Alvin Ailey Dance Center and the Martha Graham School of Dance. She is known mainly for her role as Dr. Karen Jenson in the 1998 feature film Blade.

Career 
Within a year of attending Stella Adler's Studio, Wright was starring in Anthony Drazan's Zebrahead (1992). She received positive reviews for her moving portrayal of the drug-addicted older sister of the title protagonist in Boaz Yakin's Fresh (1994). The following year, Wright played an idealistic member of the Black Panther Party in the Hughes Brothers' feature film  Dead Presidents (1995). Wright played Dr. Karen Jenson in Blade (1998).

In 1992, Wright played the recurring role of Claudia, a black civil rights activist fighting for equal opportunities in education in the acclaimed but short-lived NBC television drama I'll Fly Away. She has made guest appearances on several other television series, including New York Undercover, Homicide: Life on the Street, Chappelle's Show and Third Watch.

Wright also recorded a public service announcement for Deejay Ra's Hip-Hop Literacy campaign.

Personal life 
Wright attended the Manhattan High School for the Performing Arts. A native of Brooklyn, Wright's mother was a psychologist with the New York City Board of Education, who died in 2009 after 40+ years of marriage to Wright's father, jazz musician Stanley Wright a.k.a. Suleiman-Marim Wright, who was murdered in 2011.

Filmography

Film and TV Movies

Television

References

External links 
 
 N'Bushe Wright at Yahoo! Movies

1970 births
Living people
20th-century American actresses
21st-century American actresses
Actresses from New York City
African-American actresses
People from Brooklyn
American film actresses
American television actresses
20th-century African-American women
21st-century African-American women
21st-century African-American people